The Bispevegen ("Bishop's Road") passes between Valle in Setesdal on the western side of the mountains and Fyresdal on the eastern side. The Bispevegen is a medieval east-west track over the high plateau that priests and bishops used to get between the counties of Agder and Telemark. Every year a march called "Bispevegmarsjen" ("The Bishop's Road March") starts at Kleivgrend in Fyresdal.

References

Old roads of Norway